The 12th Hollywood Music in Media Awards were held on November 17, 2021 to recognize the best in music in film, TV, video games, commercials, and trailers. The nominations were announced on November 4, 2021. A new category named "Outstanding On-Screen Performance in a Film" was introduced.

Winners and nominees

Score

Song

Music Supervision

Other

References

External links
 Official website

Hollywood Music in Media Awards
2021 music awards
2021 film awards